The Wernher Open Pairs national bridge championship is held at the summer American Contract Bridge League (ACBL) North American Bridge Championship (NABC).

Typically starting on the Tuesday of the NABC, the Wernher Open Pairs is a four session matchpoint pairs event, with two qualifying sessions and two final sessions.
The event is open to any player, but due to its current conflicting schedule with the more prestigious Spingold Knockout Teams, it is generally considered to be the weakest open national event on the calendar.

History
The Wernher Open pairs is a four-session event with two qualifying sessions and two final sessions. It was contested at the Summer NABC until 1962. It moved to the Spring NABC in 1963 where it remained for 40 years.

In 2004, it returned to the Summer NABC lineup. From 1969 through 1971, it was contested as a three-session championship. In 1992 the event became Open Pairs II.

The winners have their names inscribed on the Wernher trophy, named after Sir Derrick J. Wernher, a leading personality in American bridge in the Thirties. Wernher -- a resident of both London and Deal NJ -- was president of the American Bridge League in 1933, chairman of its Master Plan committee and a member of the board of directors of the American Whist League.

Winners

During 56 years as the national or North American championship Men's Pairs, two champions successfully defended the title playing together: Doug Drury–Eric Murray in 1955, Phil Feldesman–Ira Rubin in 1962. Indeed, they were the only pairs to win the event twice.

Sources
 
 List of previous winners, Page 16.

 2009 winners, Page 1. 

 "Search Results". ACBL. Visit "NABC Winners"; select a Spring NABC. Retrieved 2014-06.

 "Search Results - Updated 2018" Visit 

North American Bridge Championships